Elbe is a river in the Czech Republic and Germany.

Elbe may also refer to:

Places
 Elbe (Eder), a river in Hesse, Germany
 Elbe, Lower Saxony, Germany
 Elbe, Washington, United States

People
 Jenny Elbe (born 1990), German athlete
 Lili Elbe (1882–1931), Danish artist and transgender woman
 Pascal Elbé (born 1967), French film actor and director

Ships
 Elbe, a French frigate of 1805, better known as Aréthuse
 , German naval vessel class
German ship Elbe (A511), the lead ship
 Elbe (1887 ship), a British sailing vessel
 , several steamships

Other uses
 Elbe, a variety of grape usually known as Elbling
 Elbe Air, a German airline
 Elbe Flugzeugwerke, an aerospace company in Dresden
 Elbe Project, the first commercial static high voltage direct current transmission system
 Sonderkommando Elbe, a German fighter task force in 1945